Parviz Abnar (born 19 July 1958 in Ahvaz, Iran) is an Iranian sound recordist.

He graduated from the Academy of Cinema and Television in 1978. Abnar was the sound recordist for the film Rapport in 1986. He started working in television from 1978 as a sound recordist of news, documentary and fiction films and TV series such as Ra'na (1988).

He was awarded the Crystal Simorgh for sound recording from Fajr Film Festival for Across the Fire (1986, Kianoush Ayyari), The Last Act (1990, V. Karim-Masihi) and Nargess (1991, Rakhshan Bani-Etemad).

Partial list of works 
 The Little Bird of Happiness, 1987
 The Girl by the Pond, 1991
 The Wild Duck
 The Need, 1992
 The Satanic Contact
 Eclipse
 A Man and a Bear, 1989
 Zinat, 1993
 Disarmament
 The Blue-Veiled, 1994
 Banichaw
 The Poor Lover,
 Ghazal, 1995
 The Fifth Season
 The Miracle of Laughter, 1996
 The May Lady
 The Day When the Air Stopped
 The Lost Love, 1998
 The Girl in the Sneakers
 Two Women, 1999
 The Sun Girls, 1998
 Hidden Half
 Smell of Camphor, Fragrance of Jasmine, 2000
 Thousands of Women Like Me, 2000
 Shabhaye Roshan, 2003
 Arya, 2004
 Cafe Transit, 2005
 No Men Allowed, 2011

External links

People from Ahvaz
1958 births
Living people
Sound recordists